Holly Elizabeth Hunt (born 15 March 1997) is an English field hockey player who plays as a midfielder or forward for Hampstead & Westminster and the England and Great Britain national teams.

Hunt won a Commonwealth gold medal at Birmingham in August 2022 with the England hockey team. She scored the first goal in the final in a 2-1 win over Australia. It was the first time in history that England had won the Commonwealth gold.

She was educated at Stockport Grammar School, Stockport, England.

In April 2021 Hunt joined the hockey coaching staff at Pangbourne College, Pangbourne, Berkshire.

Club career

She plays club hockey in the Women's England Hockey League Premier Division for Hampstead & Westminster.

Hunt has also played for University of Birmingham and Bowdon Hightown.

References

External links

1997 births
Living people
English female field hockey players
Women's England Hockey League players
University of Birmingham Hockey Club players
Hampstead & Westminster Hockey Club players
Field hockey players at the 2022 Commonwealth Games
Commonwealth Games gold medallists for England
Commonwealth Games medallists in field hockey
Medallists at the 2022 Commonwealth Games